Urra is a village located in the Chümoukedima District of Nagaland and is a suburb of Chümoukedima, the district headquarters.

Demographics
Urra is situated in the Chümoukedima District of Nagaland. As per the Population Census 2011, there are a total 101 households in Urra. The total population of Urra is 479.

See also
Chümoukedima District

References

Villages in Chümoukedima district